A Story About My Uncle is an adventure game by independent developer Gone North Games and published by Coffee Stain Studios in 2014. It was initially developed by students of Södertörn University in 2012, with a full release in May 2014 for Microsoft Windows, and three years later for macOS and Linux. The game was re-developed professionally after collaboration with Coffee Stain Studios.

A Story About My Uncle is played from a first-person perspective, and the player travels by using floating rocks. According to review aggregator Metacritic, the game received mixed reviews. It was nominated for the Game of the Year award at the 2012 Swedish Game Awards.

Gameplay and plot 
A Story About My Uncle is an adventure game. Played from a first-person perspective, uses platform game elements set in a world of drifting rocks. The player is searching for Uncle Fred. 

The game focuses on the narrator's uncle Fred, as the narrator tells a bedtime story to a small child. The uncle Fred is described as "a brilliant scientist – a whimsical and even-tempered version of Uncle Quentin from the Famous Five books". A board in the narrator's abandoned house tells the player that Fred built a waste disposal system, conceivably controlled by starlight. After this backstory, the game begins with the narrator as a child entering the "waste disposal dimension" to search for his uncle. The player follows the uncle character through the game environment, with the player character having a suit that is equipped with a "magical grappling hook and shock absorbers" that stop the player character from taking damage when landing. Later on in the game, the player will find and be able to use jet-propelling boots, which enable them to travel farther in one jump.

Development 
The initial ideas for developing the game were "basically playing with gravity in the world – you would turn it upside down" according to Sebastian Eriksson, co-founder of Gone North Games and one of the company's programmers. Eriksson "had been playing around with a mechanic to propel yourself within this gravity-bending game"; this ended up being the main game mechanic, and the game was built around it. The students who developed A Story About My Uncle had "to teach themselves how to use game development software" Unreal Engine because they did not have much experience in the video game field.

The game was developed over three months in 2012, in the Unreal Engine Unreal Development Kit, by a small group of students at Södertörn University. Being developed for a competition, university students were tasked to build a "non-violent first-person game in the Unreal Engine". The Södertörn students went on to form their own video game studio called Gone North Games. According to Sebastian Zethraeus, they learned how to use the engine in ten weeks and built a prototype in that time; he said that they "were proud of it at the time, but our eyes bleed now when we look at it".

A Story About My Uncle was first released on 30 July 2012 as a free demo; the demo was nominated for Game of the Year at Swedish Game Awards. Developers Gone North Games then partnered with Coffee Stain Studios to publish the game on 28 May 2014, on Steam, professionally redeveloping it in collaboration with Coffee Stain Studios. The game was released on 28 May 2014 for Microsoft Windows, and on 12 May 2017 for macOS and Linux.

Gone North Games' student developers, together with Coffee Stain Studios, polished the game by "remaking everything from the meshes to the voice acting to the code itself". Sebastian Eriksson said that being nominated for Game of the Year, and getting feedback from early players, led the group to finish the game.

Reception

A Story About My Uncle received "mixed or average" reviews, according to review aggregator Metacritic. As of December 2019 the game scored a "Very Positive" review by over 10,150 reviews on Steam.

Stephen Dunne of GodisaGeek wrote that "Some [players] may find A Story About My Uncle too easy, some people may find it infuriating", but that "most, however, will be engrossed in its ever-glowing and charismatic fantasy world". Ben Griffin of PC Gamer wrote that the game "is fast, fluid and fun". Cassidee Moser of CGMagazine praised the game for being "well-crafted and paced", adding that the "environments are varied and beautifully done" and the "story itself is a light-hearted, innocent magical romp".

Kyle Hilliard of Game Informer also found the game to be light-hearted, but did suggest that this is "at odds with the difficulty late in-game", and so confusing who the game is aimed at.

In 2012, A Story About My Uncle received a nomination for Game of the Year at the Swedish Game Awards.

References

External links 
 Official website

Adventure games
2012 video games
Windows games
Linux games
MacOS games
Single-player video games
First-person adventure games
Video games developed in Sweden
Indie video games
Coffee Stain Studios games